The 1980 Preakness Stakes was the 105th running of the $250,000 Grade 1 Preakness Stakes thoroughbred horse race. The race took place on May 17, 1980, and was televised in the United States on the ABC television network. Codex, who was jockeyed by Ángel Cordero Jr., won the race by four and three quarter lengths over runner-up Genuine Risk. Approximate post time was 5:40 p.m. Eastern Time. The race was run on a fast track in a final time of 1:54-1/5. The Maryland Jockey Club reported total attendance of 83,455, this is recorded as second highest on the list of American thoroughbred racing top attended events for North America in 1980.

Payout 

The 105th Preakness Stakes Payout Schedule

$2 Exacta:  (3–5) paid   $19.60

The full chart 

 Winning Breeder: Tartan Farms; (FL)
 Winning Time: 1:54 1/5
 Track Condition: Fast
 Total Attendance: 83,455

References

External links 

 

1980
1980 in horse racing
Horse races in Maryland
1980 in American sports
1980 in sports in Maryland